Kingston Bible College (KBC) is an Independent Fundamental Baptist College located in Kingston, Nova Scotia.

The school was established in 1929 by John J. Sidey. The first classes of Kingston Bible College were held in the Baptist Church of Kingston.

In 1937 William Freeman became the first graduate of K.B.C.  He also helped build most of the existing buildings on campus.

The current president is William J. Moorehead.

KBC teaches a literal interpretation of the Book of Genesis, including young-earth creationism.

See also

Kingston Bible College Academy

References

External links

Colleges in Nova Scotia